†Partula auriculata was a species of air-breathing tropical land snail, a terrestrial pulmonate gastropod mollusk in the family  Partulidae.

Distribution
This species was endemic to northern Raiatea, French Polynesia. It is now extinct.

References

Partula (gastropod)
Extinct gastropods
Taxa named by William Broderip
Taxonomy articles created by Polbot
Gastropods described in 1832